Hillsboro USD 410, also known as Durham-Hillsboro-Lehigh, is a public unified school district headquartered in Hillsboro, Kansas, United States.  The district includes the communities of Hillsboro, Lehigh, Durham, and nearby rural areas of Marion County.  The school district is also known as Durham-Hillsboro-Lehigh USD 410.

History
In 1945, the School Reorganization Act in Kansas caused the consolidation of thousands of rural school districts in Kansas.  In 1963, the School Unification Act in Kansas caused the further consolidatation of thousands of tiny school districts into hundreds of larger Unified School Districts. 

In 1961, Reimer Stadium was built on the south side of Tabor College campus and named after former athletic director Del Reimer.  In 2008, the old stadium was demolished then replaced by Joel Wiens Stadium in 2009, which was a joint venture between Tabor College and Hillsboro USD 410.  The new 3,000-seat stadium includes new artificial football and soccer turf, synthetic track and a throwing area for field events, new bleachers on the home side, a new press box, and new concession stand and restroom facilities.  The team locker rooms and athletic offices were also constructed at the north end of the stadium at college expense.

Current schools
The school district operates the following schools:
 Hillsboro High School at 500 East Grand Ave in Hillsboro.
 Hillsboro Middle School at 400 East Grand Ave in Hillsboro.
 Hillsboro Elementary School at 812 East A Street in Hillsboro.

Closed schools
 Lehigh High School in Lehigh. It was closed.
 Durham High School in Durham. It was closed.

See also
 Kansas State Department of Education
 Kansas State High School Activities Association
 List of high schools in Kansas
 List of unified school districts in Kansas

References

Further reading

External links
 

School districts in Kansas
Education in Marion County, Kansas